Aslı Melisa Uzun (born 11 November 1995) is a Turkish model and beauty pageant titleholder who was crowned Miss Universe Turkey 2015 and represented her country at the Miss Universe 2015 pageant.

Personal life
, Uzun was a law student at University of Cologne in Germany.

Miss Turkey 2015
On June 11, 2015, Uzun was crowned Miss Turkey Universe 2015 by the last winner, Dilan Çiçek Deniz of Istanbul in Istanbul, Turkey. While at the same pageant three other titles crowned Miss Turkey World, Miss Turkey International and Miss Turkey Supranational 2015. The twenty three contestants were fighting to get the crown during the pageant process.

Miss Universe 2015
As Miss Universe Turkey 2015, the second placed of Miss Turkey 2015 contest, Uzun competed at the Miss Universe 2015 pageant but did not place.

Filmography

Television

General references

References

External links

Official Miss Turkey website
 

Living people
Miss Universe 2015 contestants
Turkish beauty pageant winners
People from Ankara
1995 births
21st-century Turkish actresses
Turkish television actresses